List of Naval Guns, listed below by country of origin in decreasing caliber size:

Argentina
12"/50 caliber gun
7.5"/52 caliber gun
EOC 10 inch 40 caliber
EOC 15 inch 55 caliber

Austria-Hungary
Škoda 35 cm K14
Škoda 30.5 cm /45 K10
Škoda 24 cm L/40 K97
Škoda 19 cm vz. 1904
Škoda 15 cm K10
Škoda 10 cm K10
Škoda 7 cm K10
Škoda 7 cm guns

Brazil
EOC 12 inch/45 naval gun

China
 
Type 79 100 mm naval gun
H/PJ-38 130mm naval gun

France
380 mm Model 1935 naval gun
340 mm Model 1912 naval gun
340 mm Model 1881 naval gun
330 mm Model 1931 naval gun
305 mm Model 1910 naval gun
305 mm Model 1906 naval gun
305 mm Model 1893 naval gun
305 mm Model 1887 naval gun
274 mm modèle 1887/1893 naval gun
274 mm modèle 1893/1896 naval gun
240 mm Model 1902 naval gun
203 mm Model 1931 naval gun
203 mm Model 1924 naval gun
194 mm Model 1902 naval gun
194 mm Model 1893 naval gun
194 mm Model 1887 naval gun
164 mm Model 1884 naval gun
164 mm Model 1893 naval gun
155 mm Model 1920 naval gun
152 mm Model 1930 naval gun
138 mm Model 1888 naval gun
138 mm Model 1893 naval gun
138 mm Model 1910 naval gun
138 mm Model 1923 naval gun
138 mm Model 1927 naval gun
138 mm Model 1929 naval gun
138 mm Model 1934 naval gun
130 mm Model 1932 and 1935 naval gun
130 mm Model 1930 naval gun
130 mm Model 1924 naval gun
130 mm Model 1919 naval gun
100 mm Model 1891 naval gun
French 100 mm naval gun
90 mm Model 1926 naval gun
75 mm Model 1924 naval gun
Canon de 65 mm Modèle 1891
Canon Hotchkiss à tir rapide de 47 mm
Paixhans guns

Germany
40.6 cm SK C/34 Naval gun - also known as the Adolf gun, Intended for the H-class battleships which were never completed. Used as coastal artillery.
38 cm SK C/34 naval gun - World War II 
38 cm SK L/45 naval gun - World War I 
30.5 cm SK L/50 gun - World War I
28 cm SK C/34 naval gun - World War II 
28 cm SK C/28 naval gun - World War II 
28 cm SK L/50 gun - World War I
28 cm SK L/45 gun - World War I
28 cm SK L/40 gun - World War I
28 cm MRK L/40 - World War I
28 cm MRK L/35 - World War I
24 cm SK L/40 gun - World War I
24 cm K L/35 gun - World War I
21 cm SK L/45 gun - World War I
21 cm SK L/40 gun - World War I
21 cm L/35 gun - World War I
20.3 cm SK C/34 naval gun - World War II
17 cm SK L/40 gun - World War I
MONARC - modern 155 mm artillery system
15 cm SK C/36 naval gun - World War II 
15 cm TbtsK C/36 naval gun - World War II
15 cm SK C/28 - World War II 
15 cm SK C/25 - World War II 
15 cm UToF L/45 - World War I
15 cm SK L/45 naval gun - World War I
15 cm SK L/40 naval gun - World War I
15 cm SK L/35 naval gun - World War I
12.7 cm SK C/34 naval gun - World War II 
10.5 cm SK C/33 - World War II
10.5 cm SK C/32 naval gun - World War II
10.5 cm SK L/45, SK C/06, Flak L/45, Tbts L/45, Ubts L/45 - World War I and II
10.5 cm SK L/40 naval gun - World War I
10.5 cm SK L/35 - World War I
8.8 cm SK L/45, Flak L/45, Tbts KL/45 - World War I
8.8 cm SK L/35 - World War I
8.8 cm SK L/30 - World War I
8.8 cm SK C/30 naval gun - World War II
8.8 cm SK C/31 naval gun - World War II
8.8 cm SK C/32 naval gun - World War II
8.8 cm SK C/35 naval gun - World War II
5.2 cm SK L/55 gun - World War I
5 cm SK L/40 gun - World War I
3.7 cm SK C/30 - World War II
2 cm FlaK 30/38/Flakvierling - World War II

India 
CRN 91 Naval Gun

Italy
Cannone da 381/50 Ansaldo M1934
381mm / 40 Model 1914 naval gun
320 mm Model 1934 naval gun
305 mm /46 Model 1909
254 mm /45 Model 1908 naval gun
Cannone da 254/40 A
203 mm /53 Italian naval gun
203 mm /50 Italian naval gun
Cannone da 190/45
152 mm /55 Italian naval gun Models 1934 and 1936
152 mm /53 Italian naval gun Models 1926 and 1929
135 mm /45 Italian naval gun
Cannon 152/32 Model 1887
Otobreda 127/54 Compact
120 mm Italian naval gun
Cannon 102/35 Model 1914
Cannon 102/45
OTO 100 mm /47
Cannone da 76/45 S 1911
Cannon 76/40 Model 1916
Otobreda 76 mm

Japan
46 cm/45 Type 94 - Japanese 46 cm gun mounted in the s.
41 cm/45 3rd Year Type - Japanese 41 cm gun mounted in the s.
14"/36 cm/45 41st Year Type - Japanese 35.6 cm gun used on the -, - and s. 
Type 41 12-inch 45 caliber naval gun
Type 41 12-inch (305 mm)/40-caliber naval gun
Type 41 10 inch 45 caliber naval gun
10 in/40 Type 41 naval gun
20 cm/50 3rd year Type No.2 - gun used on heavy cruisers.
Type 41 8-inch (203 mm)/45-caliber naval gun
15.5 cm/60 3rd Year Type - gun used on the Yamato-class battleships and on the light cruiser .
15 cm/50 41st Year Type - gun used on the Kongō- and Fusō-class battleships and on s. 
15 cm/45 41st Year Type 
Type 41 6-inch (152 mm)/40-caliber naval gun
14 cm/50 3rd Year Type naval gun - Gun used on light cruisers.
14 cm/40 11th Year Type naval gun - Gun used on submarine cruisers.
12.7 cm/50 Model A Type 3 -  Model I.
12.7 cm/50 Model B Type 3 - Fubuki-class destroyer Model II, III and s.
12.7 cm/40 Type 89 naval gun - gun used on almost all Japanese ships cruiser size and larger, Matsu and Tachibana-class escorts.
12 cm/45 10th Year Type naval gun Anti-aircraft gun used in older carriers and some cruisers.
Type 41 4.7 inch 40 caliber naval gun
Type 3 120 mm 45 caliber naval gun - Gun used on older destroyers.
10 cm/65 Type 98 naval gun -   , aircraft carrier , .
8 cm/60 Type 98 naval gun - Anti-aircraft gun used on s.
8 cm/40 3rd Year Type naval gun - Anti-aircraft gun used on many Japanese ships built between 1910 and 1930.
Type 41 3-inch (7.62 cm)/40-caliber naval gun
Type 96 25 mm AT/AA Gun - gun used on almost all Japanese warships of World War II.

Russia / Soviet Union
 
356 mm M1913 Russian naval gun
305 mm M1948 Soviet naval gun
305 mm M1940 Soviet naval gun
Obukhovskii 12"/52 Pattern 1907 gun
Obukhovskii 12"/40 Pattern 1895 gun
254mm 45 caliber Pattern 1891
203 mm 50 caliber Pattern 1905
203mm 45 caliber Pattern 1892
180mm Pattern 1931-1933
152 mm 45 caliber Pattern 1892
6 inch 35 caliber naval gun 1877
 
130 mm M1957 Soviet naval gun
130 mm/55 B7 Pattern 1913 naval gun
130 mm/50 B13 Pattern 1936 130 mm gun from the 1940s used in the B-2LM turret 
120 mm 50 caliber Pattern 1905
120mm 45 caliber Pattern 1892
102mm 60 caliber Pattern 1911
AK-100 Naval gun
 
AK-176
 
75mm 50 caliber Pattern 1892

Spain 
 Gonzalez Hontoria de 32 cm mod 1883
 Gonzalez Hontoria de 28 cm mod 1883
 Gonzalez Hontoria de 16 cm mod 1883
 Gonzalez Hontoria de 14 cm mod 1883
 Gonzalez Hontoria de 12 cm mod 1883

Sweden
Bofors 283 mm gun
Bofors 254 mm gun
Bofors 152 mm gun
Bofors 120 mm gun
Bofors 57 mm gun
Bofors 40 mm gun

Switzerland
Oerlikon 20 mm cannon

United Kingdom
BL 18 inch Mk I naval gun
 BL 18 in / 45 naval gun, planned for the N3-class battleship
RML 17.72 inch gun
BL 16.25 inch Mk I naval gun
BL 16 inch Mk I naval gun
RML 16 inch 80 ton gun
BL 15 inch Mk I naval gun
BL 14 inch Mk VII naval gun
EOC 14 inch /45 Marks I and III
BL 13.5 inch Mk V naval gun
BL 13.5 inch Mk I-IV
RML 12.5 inch 38 ton gun
BL 12 inch Mark XIII
BL 12 inch Mk XI, Mark XII
BL 12 inch Mk X naval gun
BL 12 inch Mark IX
BL 12 inch naval gun Mk VIII
RML 12 inch 35 ton gun
EOC 12 inch /45
RML 11 inch 25 ton gun
RML 10 inch 18 ton gun
BL 10 inch Mk I-IV
Vickers 10 inch /45 naval gun
EOC 10 inch /45 naval gun
EOC 10 inch 40 caliber
RML 9 inch 12 ton gun
BL 9.2 inch naval gun Mk VIII
BL 9.2 inch Mk XI
BL 9.2 inch gun Mk IX–X
BL 9.2 inch gun Mk I–VII
BL 8 inch Mk VIII naval gun
BL 8 inch Mk I-VII naval gun
ML 8 inch shell gun
EOC 8 inch 45 caliber
EOC 8 inch 40 caliber
RML 8 inch 9 ton gun
BL 7.5-inch naval howitzer
BL 7.5-inch Mk II–V naval gun
BL 7.5 inch Mk VI naval gun
BL 7.5 inch Mk I naval gun
RML 7 inch gun
RBL 7 inch Armstrong gun
BL 6 inch Mk VII naval gun
BL 6 inch Mk XXIII naval gun
BL 6 inch Mk XXII naval gun
BL 6 inch naval guns Mk XIII – XVIII
BL 6 inch Mk XII naval gun
BL 6 inch Mk XI naval gun
BL 6 inch Mk VII
BL 6 inch gun Mk II-VI
BL 6 inch 80 pounder gun
BL 6 inch / 45 naval gun
QF 6 inch Mark N5 gun
QF 6 inch /40 naval gun
BL 5.5 inch Mark I naval gun
QF 5.25 inch Mark I naval gun
BL 5 inch gun Mk I - V
BL 4.7 inch /45 naval gun Mk I, Mk II
QF 4.7 inch naval gun
QF 4.7 inch Mk VIII naval gun
QF 4.7 inch Mk V naval gun
QF 4.7 inch Mk IX & XII
QF 4.7 inch Mark XI gun
QF 4.7 inch Gun Mk I - IV
QF 4.5 inch naval gun
QF 4.5 inch Mk I - V naval gun
4.5 inch Mark 8 naval gun
EOC 4 inch 50 caliber
QF 4 inch naval gun Mk XXIII
QF 4 inch naval gun Mk IV, XII, XXII
QF 4 inch naval gun Mk I – III
QF 4 inch Mk XVI naval gun
QF 4 inch Mk XIX naval gun
QF 4 inch Mk V naval gun
BL 4 inch naval gun Mk VII
BL 4 inch naval gun Mk I - VI
BL 4 inch Mk VIII & XI
BL 4 inch Mk IX naval gun
QF 3 inch Mk N1 naval gun
QF 14 pounder Maxim-Nordenfelt naval gun
QF 13 pounder 6 cwt naval gun Mark V
QF 12 pounder 20 cwt naval gun
QF 12 pounder 18 cwt naval gun
QF 12 pounder 12 cwt naval gun
QF 6 pounder Hotchkiss 8 cwt Mk I, Mk II
QF 6 pounder Nordenfelt
QF 6 pounder Mk IIA (Molins gun)
QF 6 pounder 10 cwt naval gun
QF 3 pounder Hotchkiss
QF 3 pounder Nordenfelt
QF 3 pounder Vickers naval gun
QF 2 pounder naval gun
QF 1-pounder pom-pom
68-pounder gun
RML 64 pounder 64 cwt gun
RBL 40 pounder Armstrong gun
RBL 20 pounder Armstrong 13 & 15 cwt
1-inch Nordenfelt gun
Armstrong Gun

United States
18-inch/48-caliber Mark 1 gun (never used)
16-inch/50-caliber Mark 7 gun
16-inch/50-caliber Mark 2 & 3 guns (used as coast artillery and on the Iowa class battleships)
16-inch/45-caliber Mark 6 gun
16-inch/45-caliber Mark 1, 5, & 8 guns
14-inch/50-caliber Mark 4, 6, 7, 11 & B guns
14-inch/45-caliber Mark 1–3, 5, 8–10, & 12 guns
13-inch/35-caliber Mark 1 & 2 guns
12-inch/50-caliber Mark 7 gun
12-inch/45-caliber Mark 5 gun
12-inch/40-caliber Mark 3 & 4 guns
12-inch/35-caliber Mark 1 & 2 guns
10-inch/40-caliber Mark 3 gun
10-inch/31-caliber Mark 1, 10-inch/30-caliber Mark 2, & 10-inch/35 caliber Mark 1 guns
8-inch/55-caliber Mark 71 Major Caliber Lightweight Gun (MCLWG)
8-inch/55-caliber Mark 9, 12, & 14–16 guns
8-inch/45-caliber Mark 6 gun
8-inch/35-caliber Mark 3 & 4 guns
8-inch/30-caliber Mark 1 & 2 guns
7-inch/44-caliber Mark 1 & 7-inch/45-caliber Mark 2 guns
155-mm/62-caliber Mark 51 Advanced Gun System (AGS) 
6-inch/54-caliber Mark 12, 14, 15 & 18 guns
6-inch/50-caliber Mark 6 & 8 guns
6-inch/47-caliber Mark 16, 16DP, & 17 guns
6-inch/40-caliber Mark 4 gun
6-inch/30-caliber Mark 1–3 guns
5-inch/62-caliber & 5-inch/54-caliber Mark 45 guns
5-inch/54-caliber Mark 42 gun
5-inch/54-caliber Mark 16 gun
5-inch/51-caliber Mark 7–9, 14, & 15 guns
5-inch/50-caliber Mark 5 & 6 guns
5-inch/40-caliber Mark 2 & 3 guns
5-inch/38-caliber Mark 21, 22, 24, 28–30, 32, 37, & 38 guns
5-inch/31-caliber Mark 1 gun
5-inch/25-caliber Mark 10, 11, 13, & 17 guns
4.7-inch/50-caliber Mark 1–3 guns (Armstrong)
4-inch/50-caliber Mark 7–10 guns 
4-inch/40-caliber Mark 1–6 guns
76-mm/62-caliber Mark 75 gun
3-inch/70-caliber Mark 26 gun
3-inch/50-caliber Mark 2, 3, 5, 6, 8, 10, 17–22 guns
3-inch/23-caliber Mark 9, 13, & 14 guns
3-inch/21-caliber Mark 1 gun (field gun for United States Navy and United States Marine Corps)
57-mm/70-caliber Mark 110 Mod 0 Bofors gun
40-mm/56-caliber Mark 1, 2, & M1 Bofors guns
30-mm Mark 46 Bushmaster II gun
1.1-inch/75-caliber gun
25-mm/87-caliber Mark 38 Machine gun system
20-mm/76-caliber M61A1 & 20-mm/99-caliber M61A1 Gatling OGB gun
20-mm Mark 16 gun
20-mm/70-caliber Mark 2–4 Oerlikon cannons

See also 
List of artillery
List of the largest cannons by caliber

References

External links 
NAVWEAPS - Naval weapons of the world, 1880 to today (retrieved 2010-02-01)

 
Naval
Naval guns